Chondropyga is a genus of scarab beetles native to eastern Australia.

Species 
 Chondropyga allardi Rigout, 1997
 Chondropyga dorsalis (Donovan, 1805)
 Chondropyga frenchi Schoch, 1898
 Chondropyga gulosa (Janson, 1873)
 Chondropyga olliffiana Janson, 1889
 Chondropyga suturata Nonfried, 1891

References

Scarabaeidae genera
Cetoniinae